Difficult People is an American dark comedy streaming television series created by Julie Klausner.  Klausner stars alongside Billy Eichner as two struggling and jaded comedians living in New York City; the duo seemingly hate everyone but each other.  

The series premiered August 5, 2015 on Hulu, and was renewed for two additional seasons. In Australia Difficult People premiered 3 August 2020 on SBS Viceland and the SBS On Demand streaming service.

Cast and characters

Main
 Julie Klausner as Julie Kessler, an aspiring comedian.
 Billy Eichner as Billy Epstein, Julie's best friend and fellow aspiring comedian.
 James Urbaniak as Arthur Tack, Julie's boyfriend.
 Andrea Martin as Marilyn Kessler, Julie's mother.
 Cole Escola as Matthew Ellis Ross (season 2–3, recurring season 1), Billy's co-worker, whom he despises.
 Shakina Nayfack as Lola (season 3, recurring season 2), a co-worker at the cafe where Billy works

Recurring
 Derrick Baskin and Gabourey Sidibe as Nate and Denise, married co-owners of the cafe where Billy works
 Tracee Chimo as Gaby, Arthur's boss at a PBS station
 Fred Armisen as Garry Epstein, Billy's brother
 Jackie Hoffman as Rucchel Epstein, Garry's wife
 John Cho as Todd, Billy's boyfriend
 Lucy Liu as Veronica Ford, Marilyn's publisher
 William Bogert as Elmer, Matthew's fiancé
 Shannon DeVido as Andrea Mumford

Guest

 Nate Corddry as Brian Walsh, Julie's high school crush
 Kate McKinnon as Abra Cadouglas, a recovering alcoholic turned magician
 John Benjamin Hickey as Fred, a date of Billy's who turns out to be a "participator"
 Kathy Najimy as Carol Donato, a friend of Marilyn's
 Amy Sedaris as Rita, a salesperson at a sporting goods store; also as a New York City tour guide in a Season 3 episode
 Malina Weissman as Renee Epstein, Billy's niece
 Ana Gasteyer as a woman with damaged eyebrows who Julie and Billy meet at a diner
 Debbie Harry as Kiki, a mysterious woman and roommate/lover of Rita
 Seth Meyers as a conman who hooks up with Billy
 Sandra Bernhard as Lilith Feigenbaum 
 John Mulaney as Cecil Jellford, a date of Billy's who turns out to be an "old-timey"
 Nyle DiMarco as Doug, Billy's deaf date
 John Early as Mickey, Doug's interpreter
 Julianne Moore as Sarah Nussbaum
 Stockard Channing as Bonnie, Marilyn's sister
 Vanessa Williams as Trish, Matthew's ex-wife
 Patton Oswalt as Kenny Jurgens
 Jane Krakowski as Lizzie McCormick, Julie's neighbour
 Victor Garber as John Passias, Billy's acting teacher
 John Turturro as Dusty, Marilyn's old flame
 Rosie O'Donnell as Vanessa
 Susan Lucci as Shelley Waxman
 Jessica Walter as Chuck's Mom
 Jami Gertz as David's Wife
 Amy Poehler as Flute, the Doula and Healologist
 Ken Burns as himself
 Luann de Lesseps and Sonja Morgan as themselves
 Tina Fey as herself
 Kathie Lee Gifford as herself
 Tony Hale as himself
 Nathan Lane as himself
 Joel McHale as Billy's trainer
 Method Man as himself
 Lin-Manuel Miranda as himself
 Kate Pierson as herself
 Maury Povich as himself
 Marc Shaiman as himself
 Martin Short as himself
 Larry Wilmore as himself
 Micky Dolenz as himself
 Justin Vivian Bond
 Sally Kellerman as Joan Gentile
 Rachel Dratch
 Andy Cohen
 Mink Stole
 Danny Aiello

Production
In May 2014, it was announced that Billy Eichner and Julie Klausner would star in a pilot for USA Network, with Klausner penning the script and Andrew Fleming directing. Amy Poehler would executive produce under Universal Cable Productions, with Dave Becky also executive producing under his 3 Arts banner, and Michele Armor of Marobru also executive producing. That same month it was announced that Rachel Dratch, Andrea Martin, James Urbaniak, and Tracee Chimo had all been cast in the series, with Martin portraying Klausner's mother. In November 2014, Hulu had acquired the series, with a straight-to-series order. In March 2015, Gabourey Sidibe and Cole Escola were cast in recurring roles.

In March 2017, John Cho joined the cast of the series.

Episodes

Season 1 (2015)

Season 2 (2016)

Season 3 (2017)

Reception
Difficult People received generally positive reviews from critics. Review aggregation website Rotten Tomatoes, gave the first season an 85% approval rating and an average rating of 8 out of 10, sampled from reviews from 20 critics. Seasons two and three both received a 100% from polled critics. The site's consensus reads, "Difficult People makes the unlikable likable with mean-spirited, unhappy characters who still can't help but amuse." On Metacritic, the first season holds a rating of 76 out of 100, based on 12 critics' reviews, implying "generally favorable reviews".

The series frequently leveled jokes about Kevin Spacey prior to public allegations against the actor.

See also
List of original programs distributed by Hulu

References

External links
 
 
 Julie Klausner's Fight for Gender Equality Through Vagina Jokes

2010s American black comedy television series
2015 American television series debuts
2017 American television series endings
2010s American LGBT-related comedy television series
American comedy web series
English-language television shows
Hulu original programming
Television duos
Television series by Universal Content Productions
Television series by 3 Arts Entertainment
Television series by Paper Kite Productions
Television shows set in New York City
Television series about comedians